Carmela: Ang Pinakamagandang Babae sa Mundong Ibabaw ( Beautiful Girl in the World) is a 2014 Philippine television drama romance series broadcast by GMA Network. Directed by Dominic Zapata, it stars Marian Rivera in the title role and Alden Richards. It premiered on January 27, 2014 on the network's Telebabad line up replacing Genesis. The series concluded on May 23, 2014 with a total of 83 episodes. It was replaced by Niño in its timeslot.

The series is streaming online on YouTube.

Cast and characters

Lead cast
 Marian Rivera as Carmela Fernandez / Catarina Bulaong
 Alden Richards as Santiago "Yago" Torres Flores

Supporting cast
 Agot Isidro as Amanda Fernandez
 Jaclyn Jose as Patricia "Trixie" Torres
 Rochelle Pangilinan as Yolanda "Yolly" Montesilva
 Raymond Bagatsing as Dante Hernando
 Roi Vinzon as Fernando Torres
 Laurice Guillen as Fides Hernando-Torres
 Freddie Webb as Ramon Corpuz
 Anna Feleo as Nida Torres
 Krystal Reyes as Janine Torres

Recurring cast
 Shermaine Santiago as Lily Suarez
 Eva Darren as Lola Wagay 
 RJ Padilla as JP 
 Barbara Miguel as Linggit 
 Jennica Garcia as Alliyah Hernando
 Marc Justine Alvarez as Bambam 
 Sandy Talag as Sabel 
 Mike Lloren as Zaldy
 Kenneth Paul Cruz as Wally
 Lloyd Samartino as Efren Flores

Guest cast
 Ricky Davao as Danilo "Dan" Fernandez
 Mona Louise Rey as young Carmela
 Stephanie Sol as Mithi
 Dex Quindoza as Milo 
 Shyr Valdez as Choleng 
 Bea Binene as Eunice
 Bryan Benedict as Leo
 Giselle Toengi as Odette 
 Arianne Bautista as Sarah
 Mike Gayoso as Dario

Ratings
According to AGB Nielsen Philippines' Mega Manila household television ratings, the pilot episode of Carmela earned an 18.1% rating. While the final episode scored a 22.2% rating.

References

External links
 
 

2014 Philippine television series debuts
2014 Philippine television series endings
Filipino-language television shows
GMA Network drama series
Philippine romance television series
Television shows set in the Philippines